Magnistipula is a genus of plant in family Chrysobalanaceae described as a genus in 1905.

Magnistipula is native to tropical Africa and Madagascar.

Species

References

Chrysobalanaceae
Flora of Africa
Chrysobalanaceae genera
Taxonomy articles created by Polbot